tripartite motif containing 45, also known as TRIM45, is a human gene.

This gene encodes a member of the tripartite motif family. The encoded protein may function as a [transcriptional repressor of the mitogen-activated protein kinase pathway. Alternatively spliced transcript variants have been described.

Model organisms				

Model organisms have been used in the study of TRIM45 function. A conditional knockout mouse line, called Trim45tm1a(KOMP)Wtsi was generated as part of the International Knockout Mouse Consortium program — a high-throughput mutagenesis project to generate and distribute animal models of disease to interested scientists.

Male and female animals underwent a standardized phenotypic screen to determine the effects of deletion. Twenty six tests were carried out on mutant mice and three significant abnormalities were observed. No homozygous mutant embryos were identified during gestation, and therefore none survived until weaning. The remaining tests were carried out on heterozygous mutant adult mice; males had increased circulating magnesium levels while animals of both sex displayed increased bone strength.

References

Further reading 
 

 
 
 
 

Genes mutated in mice